Seghwaert is a RandstadRail station in Zoetermeer, the Netherlands.

History

The station opened, as a railway station, on 28 May 1978 as part of the Zoetermeerlijn, operating Zoetermeer Stadslijn services. The train station closed on 3 June 2006 and reopened as a RandstadRail station on 29 October 2006 for the HTM tram services (4), and on 20 October 2007 for tram service 3.  

The station features 2 platforms. These platforms are low, and the same level as the tram doors, therefore making it step free. The station is the last station where passengers can change between lines 3 and 4.

Train services
The following services currently call at Seghwaert:

Gallery

Railway stations opened in 1978
RandstadRail stations in Zoetermeer